Les Ormes is a commune in the Yonne department in Bourgogne-Franche-Comté in north-central France.

History
During World War II, the Yonne region fell under German occupation after the Battle of France in 1940. The area would again see fighting in August 1944 during Operation Houndsworth, in which local Maquis resistance fighters and British commandos from the Special Air Service were tasked with harassing German troops behind the frontlines.

On August 23, 1944, a detachment of commandos from C Squadron, 1st Special Air Service (led by Captain Derrick Harrison) stumbled upon a Waffen-SS unit preparing to execute local civilians in Les Ormes' town square. The two SAS jeeps opened fire on the Germans, and a brief firefight ensued before the commandos made their escape. Harrison estimated at least 60 German soldiers wounded or killed in action. One commando, Lance Corporal James 'Curly' Hall, was killed.

See also
Communes of the Yonne department

References

Communes of Yonne